Steve Buckley (born 16 October 1953) is an English former footballer. His brother Alan Buckley and nephew Adam Buckley also played professionally.

In 1974, he was snapped up by Luton Town where he spent four seasons before moving to Derby County. At Derby he was twice voted player-of-the-season, winning the award for the 1979-1980 and 1981–1982 seasons.

Buckley joined Lincoln City for the 1986–87 season and he made a total of 72 appearances for them in two seasons. After his time at Lincoln he moved on to Boston United.

References

1953 births
Living people
People from Eastwood, Nottinghamshire
Footballers from Nottinghamshire
English footballers
Association football defenders
English Football League players
Borrowash Victoria A.F.C. players
Burton Albion F.C. players
Luton Town F.C. players
Derby County F.C. players
Lincoln City F.C. players
Boston United F.C. players
English football managers
Corby Town F.C. managers